Christiane (Janni) Nüsslein-Volhard (born 20 October 1942) is a German developmental biologist and a 1995 Nobel Prize in Physiology or Medicine laureate. She is the only woman from Germany to have received a Nobel Prize in the sciences.

Nüsslein-Volhard earned her PhD in 1974 from the University of Tübingen, where she studied protein-DNA interaction.  She won the Albert Lasker Award for Basic Medical Research in 1991 and the Nobel Prize in Physiology or Medicine in 1995, together with Eric Wieschaus and Edward B. Lewis, for their research on the genetic control of embryonic development.

Early life and education
Nüsslein-Volhard was born in Magdeburg on 20 October 1942, the second of five children to Rolf Volhard, an architect, and Brigitte Haas Volhard, a nursery school teacher. She has four siblings: three sisters and one brother. She grew up and went to school in south Frankfurt, exposed to art and music and thus was "trained in looking at things and recognizing things". Her great-grandfather was the chemist Jacob Volhard, her grandfather the known internist Franz Volhard. She is the aunt of the Nobel laureate in chemistry Benjamin List.

After the Abitur in 1962, she briefly considered pursuing medicine, but dropped the idea after doing a month’s nursing course in a hospital. Instead she followed her genuine interest and opted to study biology at Johann Wolfgang Goethe University in Frankfurt. In 1964 Nüsslein-Volhard left Frankfurt for the University of Tübingen, to start a new course in biochemistry. She originally wanted to do behavioral biology, "but then somehow I ended up in biochemistry (...) and molecular genetics because at the time this was the most modern aspect, and I was ambitious — I wanted to go where the leaders were. The old-fashioned botanists and zoologists were such dull people— there was nothing interesting there." 

She received a diploma in biochemistry in 1969 and earned a PhD in 1974 for research into protein–DNA interactions and the binding of RNA polymerase in Escherichia coli.

Career
In 1975 Nüsslein-Volhard became a postdoctoral researcher in Walter Gehring´s laboratory at the Biozentrum, University of Basel, a specialist in the developmental biology of Drosophila melanogaster (fruit fly) supported by a long-term fellowship from the European Molecular Biology Organization (EMBO).
In 1977, she continued in the laboratory of Klaus Sander at University of Freiburg, who was an expert in embryonic patterning.
In 1978, she set up her own lab in the newly founded European Molecular Biology Laboratory in Heidelberg with Eric Wieschaus, whom she had met in Basel. Over the next three years they examined about 20,000 mutated fly families, collected about 600 mutants with an altered body pattern and found that out of the about 5,000 essential genes only 120 were essential for early development. In October 1980, they published the mere 15 genes controlling the segmented pattern of the Drosophila larva. 

In 1981, Nüsslein-Volhard moved to the Friedrich Miescher Laboratory of the Max Planck Society in Tübingen. 
From 1984 until her retirement in 2014, she was the Director of the Max Planck Institute for Developmental Biology in Tübingen and also led its Genetics Department. After 1984 she launched work on the developmental biology of vertebrates, using the zebrafish (Danio rerio) as her research model. 

In 2001, she became a member of the Nationaler Ethikrat (National Ethics Council of Germany) for the ethical assessment of new developments in the life sciences and their influence on the individual and society. Her primer for the lay-reader, Coming to Life: How Genes Drive Development, was published in April 2006.

In 2004, she started the Christiane Nüsslein-Volhard Foundation (Christiane Nüsslein-Volhard Stiftung) which aids promising young female German scientists with children. The foundation's main focus is to facilitate childcare as a supplement to existing stipends and day care.

Research

During the late 1970s and early 1980s little was known about the genetic and molecular mechanisms by which multicellular organisms develop from single cells to morphologically complex forms during embryogenesis. Nüsslein-Volhard and Wieschaus identified genes involved in embryonic development by a series of  genetic screens, generating random mutations in fruit flies using ethyl methanesulfonate. Some of these mutations affected genes involved in the development of the embryo. They took advantage of the segmented form of Drosophila larvae to address the logic of the genes controlling development. In normal unmutated Drosophila, each segment produces bristles called denticles in a band arranged on the side of the segment closer to the head (the anterior). They looked at the pattern of segments and denticles in each mutant under the microscope, and were therefore able to work out that particular genes were involved in different processes during development based on their differing mutant phenotypes (such as fewer segments, gaps in the normal segment pattern, and alterations in the patterns of denticles on the segments). Many of these genes were given descriptive names based on the appearance of the mutant larvae, such as hedgehog, gurken (German: "cucumbers"), and Krüppel ( "cripple"). Later, researchers identified exactly which gene had been affected by each mutation, thereby identifying a set of genes crucial for Drosophila embryogenesis. The subsequent study of these mutants and their interactions led to important new insights into early Drosophila development, especially the mechanisms that underlie the step-wise development of body segments.

These experiments are not only distinguished by their sheer scale (with the methods available at the time, they involved an enormous workload), but more importantly by their significance for organisms other than fruit flies. It was later found that many of the genes identified had homologues in other species. In particular, the homeobox genes (coding for transcription factors critically involved in early body development) are found in all metazoans, and usually have similar roles in body segmentation.

Her findings led to important realizations about evolution – for example, that protostomes and deuterostomes are likely to have had a relatively well-developed common ancestor with a much more complex body plan than had been conventionally thought. Additionally, they greatly increased our understanding of the regulation of transcription, as well as cell fate during development.

Nüsslein-Volhard is associated with the discovery of Toll, which led to the identification of toll-like receptors.

, Nüsslein-Volhard has an h-index of 104 according to Scopus.

Personal life
Nüsslein-Volhard married in the mid-1960s while studying at the Johann Wolfgang Goethe University in Frankfurt, but divorced soon afterward and did not have any children. She lives in Bebenhausen, Germany. She has said that she loves to sing, play the flute and do chamber music. She published a cookbook in 2006.

Awards and honors

1986: Gottfried Wilhelm Leibniz Prize of the German Research Foundation
1986: Franz Vogt Award of the University of Giessen
 1991: Albert Lasker Award for Basic Medical Research
 1991: Keith R. Porter Lecture
 1992: Alfred P. Sloan, Jr. Prize
 1992: Louis-Jeantet Prize for Medicine
 1992: Louisa Gross Horwitz Prize from Columbia University
 1992: Otto Warburg Medal of the German Society for Biochemistry and Molecular Biology
 1992: Otto Bayer Award
 1993: Sir Hans Krebs Medal from the Federation of European Biochemical Societies
 1993: Ernst Schering Prize
 1994: Merit Cross of the Federal Republic of Germany
 1995: Nobel Prize in Physiology or Medicine
 1996: Order of Merit of Baden-Württemberg
 1997: Pour le Mérite for Sciences and Arts
 2005: Grand Merit Cross with Star and Sash of the Federal Republic of Germany (Großes Verdienstkreuz mit Stern und Schulterband)
 2007: German Founder Award of the Federation of German Foundations
 2009: Austrian Decoration for Science and Art
 2013–2021: Chancellor of the order Pour le Mérite for Sciences and Arts
 2014: Bavarian Maximilian Order for Science and Art
 2019: Schiller Prize of the City of Marbach
 The asteroid 15811 Nüsslein-Volhard is named in her honour

Honorary degrees 
Nüsslein-Volhard has been awarded honorary degrees by the following Universities: Yale, Harvard, Princeton, Rockefeller, Utrecht, University College London, Oxford (June 2005), Sheffield, St Andrews (June 2011), Freiburg, Munich and Bath (July 2012).

 1991: Honorary doctorate from the University of Utrecht
 1991: Honorary doctorate from Princeton University
 1993: Honorary doctorate from the University of Freiburg
 1993: Honorary doctorate from Harvard University
 2001: Honorary doctorate from Rockefeller University
 2002: Honorary doctorate from University College London
 2005: Honorary doctorate from University of Oxford
 2007: Honorary doctorate from Weizmann Institute of Science
 2008: Mercator Professorship, University of Duisburg-Essen
 2011: Honorary doctorate from the University of St Andrews
 2012: Honorary doctorate from the University of Bath

Memberships 
 1989: Founding member of the Academia Europaea
 1989: Corresponding member of the Heidelberg Academy of Sciences
 1990: Corresponding member of North Rhine-Westphalia Academy for Sciences and Arts
 1990: Elected a Foreign Member of the Royal Society (ForMemRS), London
 1990: Member of the National Academy of Sciences, Washington
 1991: Member of the German Academy of Sciences Leopoldina
1992: Member of the American Academy of Arts and Sciences
1995: Member of the American Philosophical Society
 2001–2006: Member of the National Ethics Council of the Federal Government (German Ethics Council)
 Member of the French Academy of Sciences
 Member of the Scientific Committee of the Ingrid zu Solms Foundation
 Member of the European Molecular Biology Organization

See also
 Timeline of women in science

Notes

References

External links

  including the Nobel Lecture on 8 December 1995 The Identification of Genes Controlling Development in Flies and Fishes

1942 births
Living people
German biochemists
German geneticists
German physiologists
German embryologists
German women biochemists
German women biologists
Women geneticists
Women medical researchers
Women physiologists
Women Nobel laureates
German Nobel laureates
Nobel laureates in Physiology or Medicine
Foreign associates of the National Academy of Sciences
Members of the European Molecular Biology Organization
Fellows of the American Academy of Arts and Sciences
Fellows of the AACR Academy
Foreign Members of the Royal Society
Max Planck Society people
Members of Academia Europaea
Members of the French Academy of Sciences
Gottfried Wilhelm Leibniz Prize winners
Grand Crosses with Star and Sash of the Order of Merit of the Federal Republic of Germany
Recipients of the Pour le Mérite (civil class)
Recipients of the Albert Lasker Award for Basic Medical Research
Recipients of the Order of Merit of Baden-Württemberg
Recipients of the Austrian Decoration for Science and Art
Goethe University Frankfurt alumni
Academic staff of the University of Duisburg-Essen
University of Tübingen alumni
Academic staff of the University of Tübingen
Scientists from Magdeburg
20th-century German women scientists
21st-century German women scientists
20th-century German biologists
21st-century German biologists
Members of the American Philosophical Society
Max Planck Institute directors